Albanian-Italian singer Ermal Meta released four albums and thirteen singles between 2014 and 2019, as well as one single as a featured artist in 2013.

Albums

Studio albums

Live albums

Singles

As lead artist

As featured artist

Credits

References

 

Discographies of Albanian artists
Discographies of Italian artists